Lorenzo Piretto, O.P. (born 15 December 1942) is the emeritus Archbishop of Izmir and a Dominican friar. He was ordained to the episcopate and installed as Archbishop of Izmir on 20 December 2015, five days after his 73rd birthday.

Biography
Lorenzo Piretto was born in Mazzè in the frazione of Tonengo in 1942, and was ordained as a Dominican priest in 1966. He continued his theological studies in Bologna, where he was licensed in 1967, and in Turin where he became a doctor in 1972. From 1967 to 1974 he taught philosophy at the Dominican seminary of Chieri.

From 1983 to 2005 he taught Italian at Marmara University and, during the same period, was a journalist for the Christian review publication Presence.

From 2004 to 2015, he was a parson in St Peter and Paul church in Istanbul.

On 7 November 2015 Pope Francis appointed him Archbishop of Izmir. He was consecrated on 20 December 2015, by Armenian Catholic Archeparch of Istanbul Boghos Lévon Zékiyan.

He resigned on 8 December 2020.

References

External links

1942 births
Roman Catholic archbishops of Izmir
Living people
21st-century Italian Roman Catholic archbishops
University of Bologna alumni
University of Turin alumni
People from the Province of Turin
Italian Dominicans
Italian expatriates in Turkey
Dominican bishops